Madonna Bellina (fl. 1550) was a Jewish-Italian musician and singer.

She was the subject of a poem by the Venetian playwright and satirist Andrea Calmo, who praised her musical ability. She was active as a singer as well as an instrumentalist. She was praised by her contemporaries for her ability. she was also active as a composer.

References

 The JPS Guide to Jewish Women: 600 B.C.E.to 1900 C.E.

Year of birth unknown
Year of death unknown
16th-century Jews
16th-century Italian women singers
Jewish opera singers
16th-century Italian composers
16th-century women composers